The green-faced parrotfinch (Erythrura viridifacies) is a species of estrildid finch found in northern Philippines, on Luzon, Mindoro, Panay, Negros and Cebu islands. Its local name is mayang-kawayan in Tagalog.

Description

The green-faced parrotfinch is approximately 12–13 cm long. This species green plumage except for its bright red uppertail-coverts and tail and darker fringes to the primaries. It has a long pointed tail. The female is slightly shorter and shows buff on the lower belly and vent. Both sexes have a large, dark bill. The green-faced parrotfinch makes a short, high-pitched tsit tsit, chattering and grating notes.

Habitat and Conservation Status
It inhabits tropical moist montane forest, forest edge and even savannah, often above 1,000 m, but is occasionally found in the lowlands. It is usually found together with flowering or seeding bamboos, which are its food supply. 

The IUCN has assessed this species as Vulnerable with the population being estimated at 6,000 to 15,000 mature individuals remaining. This species is threatened by deforestation which removes its food supply (bamboo seeds). The cage-bird trade has also affected its population as large numbers of green-faced parrotfinch in many districts of Manila have been caught and exported to the United States. 

This species is currently conserved in two protected areas, the Northern Sierra Madre Natural Park and Bataan Natural Park/Subic Bay but actual enforcement is lax. Also, due to its nomadic habits, occurrence in protected areas does not necessarily confer continuous protection.

References

External links

Species factsheet – BirdLife International

green-faced parrotfinch
Endemic birds of the Philippines
Birds of Cebu
Birds of Luzon
Birds of Negros Island
Birds of Panay
green-faced parrotfinch
green-faced parrotfinch
green-faced parrotfinch